Meteorological Administration, Meteorological Agency, Meteorological Service, Weather Bureau, or Weather Service may refer to:
 A meteorological service
 Meteorological Service of Canada
 Meteorological Service of Catalonia
 China Meteorological Administration, the national weather service for the People's Republic of China
 National Meteorological Center of CMA, the China Meteorological Administration in the People's Republic of China
 Finnish Meteorological Institute
 Korea Meteorological Administration, the National Meteorological service for South Korea
 Japan Meteorological Agency, the Japanese government's weather service
 Malaysian Meteorological Department
 MetService, Meteorological Service of New Zealand Limited
 Hydrometeorological Centre of Russia, founded as Meteorological Service of the Russian Soviet Federative Socialist Republic
 Meteorological Service Singapore
 Central Weather Bureau, the government meteorological research and forecasting institution of Taiwan
 National Weather Service, one of the agencies that make up the U.S. federal government's National Oceanic and Atmospheric Administration
 Air Force Weather Agency, the military meteorology center of the United States Air Force